The 2001 South American Under-17 Football Championship was played in Peru from 2 to 18 March 2001.

The host of the competition was the city of Arequipa.

First round
The 10 national teams were divided in 2 groups of 5 teams each. The top 2 teams qualified for the final round.

Group A

Group B

Final round
The final round were played in the same system that first round, with the best 4 teams.

Brazil, Argentina and Paraguay qualify to 2001 FIFA U-17 World Championship.

Top goalscorers

References 

South American Under-17 Football Championship
International association football competitions hosted by Peru
Under-17 Football Championship, 2001
Under
2001 in youth association football